Richard Lewis Thornburgh (July 16, 1932 – December 31, 2020) was an American lawyer, author, and Republican politician who served as the 41st governor of Pennsylvania from 1979 to 1987, and then as the United States attorney general from 1988 to 1991. Before his time as attorney general and governor, he served as the United States attorney for the Western District of Pennsylvania.

Early life and education
Thornburgh was born in Pittsburgh, Pennsylvania, on July 16, 1932, the son of Alice (Sanborn) and Charles Garland Thornburgh, an engineer. Thornburgh attended Mercersburg Academy then Yale University from which he obtained an engineering degree in 1954. Subsequently, he received a law degree from the University of Pittsburgh School of Law in 1957, where he served as an editor of the Law Review. Thornburgh was inducted into Omicron Delta Kappa at the University of Pittsburgh in 1973, and was later awarded the society's highest honor, the Laurel Crowned Circle Award, in 1996. He subsequently was awarded honorary degrees from 32 other colleges and universities. He joined the Pittsburgh-based law firm Kirkpatrick & Lockhart in 1959.

Thornburgh married Ginny Hooton, and they had three sons together (John, David and Peter). Ginny Hooton was killed in an automobile accident in 1960, which left Peter, the youngest of their three sons, with physical and intellectual disability. In 1963 Thornburgh was remarried, to Ginny Judson, with whom he had another son, Bill, in 1966. Ginny (Judson) Thornburgh was a former schoolteacher from New York, who holds degrees from Wheaton College in Norton, Massachusetts, and the Harvard Graduate School of Education. A lifelong advocate of people with disabilities, she served as Director of the Interfaith Initiative of the American Association of People with Disabilities, based in Washington, D.C., and has co-authored and edited "That All May Worship," an award-winning handbook for religious congregations working to include people with all types of disabilities. She received the Hubert H. Humphrey Civil Rights Award from the Leadership Conference on Civil Rights in April 2005.

The Thornburghs have four sons (John, David, Peter, and Bill), six grandchildren, and four great-granddaughters and one great-grandson. As parents of a son with a disability, they took an interest in the needs of people with disabilities and, with their son Peter, were named "Family of the Year". Both Ginny and Dick Thornburgh were featured speakers at the Vatican Conference on Disabilities held in Rome in November 1992, and were co-recipients in 2003 of the Henry B. Betts Award, the proceeds from which were used to establish the Thornburgh Family Lecture Series on Disability Law and Policy at the University of Pittsburgh. As Attorney General of the United States, Thornburgh played a leading role in the enactment of the Americans with Disabilities Act. In 2002, Thornburgh received the Wiley A. Branton Award of The Washington Lawyers' Committee for Civil Rights and Urban Affairs in recognition of his "commitment to the civil rights of people with disabilities."

Career

U.S. Attorney
Following an unsuccessful bid for the U.S. House of Representatives against William S. Moorhead in 1966, Thornburgh served as an elected delegate to the 1967–1968 Pennsylvania Constitutional Convention where he spearheaded efforts at judicial and local government reform. In 1969 President of the United States Richard Nixon appointed Thornburgh as the U.S. Attorney for the Western District of Pennsylvania, where he earned a reputation as being tough on organized crime. In 1971, Thornburgh successfully took Pittsburgh steel companies to court for polluting rivers based on the 1899 Refuse Act. This was before the major environmental laws that are the backbone of the EPA were passed, and was a sign of what was to come.

In 1975, President Gerald Ford appointed him to serve as the Assistant Attorney General for the Justice Department's Criminal Division. After two years at that post, Thornburgh returned to law practice in Pittsburgh and initiated a campaign for governor.

Governor of Pennsylvania

In 1978, Thornburgh launched a campaign for governor of Pennsylvania. He won the primary over six other contenders, including Arlen Specter, who had become well known as a former Democrat who switched parties and was elected the Philadelphia County district attorney in 1965 and the more conservative David W. Marston, a former U.S. attorney in Philadelphia, who was controversially dismissed in 1978 by the Jimmy Carter administration after Marston launched prosecution of two Democratic congressmen and two Democratic state legislators.

Despite a Democratic majority in the commonwealth, he and running mate Bill Scranton (whose father served as governor in the 1960s) defeated Pittsburgh mayor Pete Flaherty and his running mate, educator Bob Casey (who bears no relation to Robert P. Casey, the 42nd Governor of Pennsylvania). The victory was attributed in part to Thornburgh's campaign promises to crack down on government corruption, at a time when more than 60 persons in the Shapp administration were indicted on criminal charges. Thornburgh and Scranton were reelected in 1982. However, Scranton failed to win the governorship on his own in 1986.

Following the unprecedented 1979 Three Mile Island nuclear power plant accident near Harrisburg, Pennsylvania, Governor Thornburgh was described by observers as "one of the few authentic heroes of that episode as a calm voice against panic." He oversaw emergency response efforts to the partial meltdown at the nuclear power plant and also had a major role in coordinating funding for cleanup efforts.

He was widely recognized for economic development and the establishment of the Ben Franklin Partnership, and for implementing welfare reform programs. Pennsylvania's unemployment rate, among the ten highest in the nation when he was elected, was among the ten lowest when he left office as 50,000 new businesses and 500,000 new private sector jobs were created during his tenure.

Thornburgh was also responsible for consolidating all of Pennsylvania's state-owned colleges and universities into the Pennsylvania State System of Higher Education. He also created the Governor's Schools, which were summer programs for talented and gifted high school students.

In January 1987, Governor Thornburgh was made an honorary Pennsylvania State Police Trooper and this honor was presented to him upon the graduation of the 64th Pennsylvania State Police Academy Class at Hershey, Pennsylvania.

Thornburgh was the first Republican to serve two successive terms as governor of the commonwealth. Recognized by fellow governors in a 1986 Newsweek poll as one of the most effective big-state governors in the nation.

After leaving office in 1987, Thornburgh served as director of the Institute of Politics at the John F. Kennedy School of Government at Harvard University.

U.S. Attorney General
In 1988, President Ronald Reagan appointed Thornburgh as the United States Attorney General and he was retained in office after President George H. W. Bush was inaugurated. Thornburgh was sworn into office after unanimous confirmation by the United States Senate and served three years as attorney general, 1988–1991.

He mounted a vigorous attack on white-collar crime as the Department of Justice obtained a record number of convictions of savings and loan crisis and other securities officials, defense contractors and corrupt public officials. Thornburgh established strong ties with law enforcement agencies around the world to help combat drug trafficking, money laundering, terrorism and international white-collar crime. During his tenure as attorney general, he twice argued and won cases before the United States Supreme Court. The Legal Times noted that Thornburgh as Attorney General "built a reputation as one of the most effective  champions that prosecutors have ever had." As honorary Special Agent of the Federal Bureau of Investigation, he chaired a panel of the National Academy of Public Administration examining the FBI's post-9/11 transformation process and was a member of the FBI Director's advisory board. He oversaw the major environmental litigation that resulted from the Exxon Valdez oil spill in 1989.

All told, Thornburgh served in the Justice Department under five Presidents, beginning in Pittsburgh when serving as United States Attorney, from 1969 to 1975.

Later political life
He resigned as attorney general in 1991 to run for the U.S. Senate seat left vacant when Senator John Heinz was killed in a plane crash; major-party candidates were chosen by the party committees because it was too late for a primary. There was widespread speculation that Thornburgh had struck a deal with Democratic Pennsylvania Congressman and House Majority Whip William H. Gray. Gray had been the subject of an investigation into alleged campaign finance irregularities and a grand jury investigation into his church's financial dealings. It was reported that Gray would not run in the special election and in return Thornburgh would drop the investigation into him. Gray did not run in the election and in fact resigned from Congress two months prior to it in order to take a job as president and CEO of the United Negro College Fund. Thornburgh was widely expected to win the seat; however, he was defeated in an upset by Democrat Harris Wofford, who had been the interim appointee to that seat. In 1993, Thornburgh's campaign committee was sued in federal court by Karl Rove, who won the case and collected $180,000 from the Thornburgh committee.

Thornburgh served a one-year appointment as Under-Secretary General at the United Nations (1992–1993) at the personal request of President Bush. This UN top management position put Thornburgh in charge of personnel, budget and finance matters. His Report to the Secretary-General of the United Nations was widely praised.  It pertained to reform, restructuring and streamlining efforts designed to make the United Nations peacekeeping, humanitarian and development programs more efficient and cost-effective.

Later life

After his 25 years in public service, Thornburgh re-entered private legal practice returning to K&L Gates, the law firm he originally joined in 1959. In 2002, the U.S. Bankruptcy Court in the Southern District of New York appointed him as an examiner in the WorldCom bankruptcy proceedings. His report to the court included damning criticism of Arthur Andersen, WorldCom's accounting firm, and banking giant Citigroup. The report concluded that the two companies aided WorldCom executives in committing fraud.

In 2004, Thornburgh was asked by CBS to undertake an independent investigation of the so-called Rathergate controversy with former Associated Press CEO, Lou Boccardi. Following the investigation and report, Dan Rather relinquished his anchor position on the "CBS Evening News." Then in October 2005 Thornburgh was asked to represent controversial Democratic Pennsylvania politician and nationally renowned forensic pathologist Dr. Cyril Wecht, who was then serving as Coroner of Allegheny County. The federal grand jury in Pittsburgh had returned an 84 count felony indictment against Dr. Wecht. Ultimately all charges were dismissed after  years, on May 14, 2009.

In February 2013, Thornburgh released a report criticizing the conclusions of Louis Freeh about the Penn State child sex abuse scandal involving Jerry Sandusky. Thornburgh was hired by the family of the late coach Joe Paterno to conduct an independent review of the Freeh report.

Thornburgh also served as a consultant to the United Nations, the World Bank and the Inter-American Development Bank on efforts to battle fraud and corruption.

Thornburgh, a long-time supporter of self-determination, authored "Puerto Rico's Future: A Time to Decide" in 2007, in which he calls for immediate change in the island's territorial/commonwealth status. He describes it as a vestige of colonialism. He concedes, however, that change is difficult because equal segments of Puerto Ricans desire statehood or continuation of the status quo. The book is based in part on ongoing research he has done regarding Puerto Rico's vexing political status problem since he testified as attorney general on behalf of the first Bush administration on the issue before the Energy and Natural Resources Committee of the United States Senate in 1991 and for an amicus curiae brief he filed in a Puerto Rico voting rights case before the U.S. Court of Appeals for the First Circuit.

Throughout his career, Thornburgh traveled widely by visiting over 40 countries and meeting with leaders from Canada, Mexico, Europe, Africa, the Middle East, Russia, Ukraine, Japan, China, Taiwan, Korea, India, Cambodia, Australia, New Zealand and Central and South America. He served as an observer to the Russian Federation's first legislative (1993) and presidential (1996) elections. He was a former member of the Council on Foreign Relations.

The K&L Gates site includes nearly 50 published articles and white papers by Thornburgh; they serve as a documentation of his career between 2001 and 2011.

Thornburgh died at a retirement community in Verona, Pennsylvania, on December 31, 2020, at age 88.

Dick Thornburgh Papers
The Dick Thornburgh Papers were donated to the University of Pittsburgh in 1998. The collection is housed in the university's Hillman Library where it is showcased in a themed reading room. The university also established the Dick Thornburgh Forum in Law and Public Policy in his honor.

In April 2019, Thornburgh announced he was retiring from K&L Gates, the only private law firm with which he had ever been associated. The announcement came 60 years after Thornburgh first joined the firm.

Publications
Puerto Rico's Future: A Time to Decide, Center for Strategic and International Studies Press, 2007, 
Where the Evidence Leads, autobiography by Dick Thornburgh, University of Pittsburgh Press, 2007,

References

External links

|-

|-

|-

|-

|-

|-

1932 births
2020 deaths
20th-century American politicians
American Episcopalians
Fellows of the United States National Academy of Public Administration
George H. W. Bush administration cabinet members
Republican Party governors of Pennsylvania
Harvard Kennedy School staff
Mercersburg Academy alumni
Politicians from Pittsburgh
Reagan administration cabinet members
Reagan administration controversies
United States Assistant Attorneys General for the Criminal Division
United States Attorneys for the Western District of Pennsylvania
United States Attorneys General
University of Pittsburgh School of Law alumni
Yale School of Engineering & Applied Science alumni
Writers from Pittsburgh